Limond is a Scottish surname. Notable people by that name include:

 David Limond (1831-1895), British soldier of the Royal Engineers (Bengal)
 Brian Limond, known as "Limmy", (born 1974), Scottish comedian
 Willie Limond (born 1979), Scottish boxer

Scottish culture
Scottish surnames